William W. Moss III (1935-2007) was an American archivist and Chinese language specialist.

Biography

Life
Moss was born in 1935. He attended Haverford College in Haverford, Pennsylvania, and received a Bachelor of Arts degree in 1957. During his time in the United States Navy, he spent a year studying Chinese at the Army Language School in Monterey, California He later attended Columbia University in New York City, and studied Chinese, government, and public law there from 1963 to 1964, receiving a Master of Arts a year later.

He died in 2007.

Career
Moss joined the United States Navy in 1958, and continued to serve until 1963. In 1964 he began working at the National Security Agency as an Intelligence Research Analyst in foreign language, and held this position until 1969, after which he became an Oral History Interviewer at the John F. Kennedy Library in Boston, Massachusetts. A year later, in 1970, he became the Chief of the Oral History Program. In 1972, he became the library's Senior Archivist for national security and foreign affairs materials, a position he held until 1975, when he was renamed the Chief Archivist. From 1978 to 1979 he served as president of the Oral History Association.

Moss joined the Smithsonian Institution as an archivist and the director of the archives in 1983. He helped establish the Council of Information and Education Directors, of which he was head for two years. He was a chairman for the SI archives and the Special Collections Council for three years. After retiring in 1993, he took up teaching at the Foreign Affairs University in Beijing, China, in the International Programs Office. He was named their first Archivist Emeritus.

References

Link to obituary that appeared in Boston Globe
Link to list of past presidents of the Oral History Association.

1935 births
2007 deaths
American archivists